Emil Pollert is a former Czechoslovak slalom canoeist who competed in the 1960s. He won a gold medal in the C-2 team event at the 1965 ICF Canoe Slalom World Championships in Spittal.

References

Living people
Czechoslovak male canoeists
Medalists at the ICF Canoe Slalom World Championships
Year of birth missing (living people)